Franz Beckert (13 March 1907 – 7 September 1973) was a German gymnast who competed in the 1936 Summer Olympics.

References

1907 births
1973 deaths
German male artistic gymnasts
Olympic gymnasts of Germany
Gymnasts at the 1936 Summer Olympics
Olympic gold medalists for Germany
Olympic medalists in gymnastics
Medalists at the 1936 Summer Olympics
20th-century German people